Hettipola (Sinhalese language: හෙට්ටිපොල) is a town in Kurunegala District, North Western Province of Sri Lanka. It consists of 15 Grama Niladari divisions. Hettipola is connected with Colombo through Kuliyapitiya and Negombo.

References

Populated places in North Western Province, Sri Lanka
Populated places in Kurunegala District
Kurunegala